Emory is a census-designated place (CDP) in Washington County, Virginia, United States. The population was 1,237 at the 2020 census down from 1,251 at the 2010 census. The community is named for and is the location of Emory and Henry College.

It is part of the Kingsport–Bristol (TN)–Bristol (VA) Metropolitan Statistical Area, which is a component of the Johnson City–Kingsport–Bristol, TN-VA Combined Statistical Area – commonly known as the "Tri-Cities" region.

The Emory post office was established in 1847.

Notable people
 Frankie Newton (1906 – 1954) – jazz trumpeter

References

External links
 Welcome to Emory, VA

Census-designated places in Virginia
Census-designated places in Washington County, Virginia
Kingsport–Bristol metropolitan area
U.S. Route 11